Mount Martin is a national park in Queensland, Australia, 829 km northwest of Brisbane.

See also

 Protected areas of Queensland

References 

National parks of Queensland
Protected areas established in 1994
North Queensland